The speeches and debates of Ronald Reagan comprise the seminal oratory of the 40th President of the United States. Reagan began his career in Iowa as a radio broadcaster. In 1937, he moved to Los Angeles where he started acting, first in films and later television. After delivering a stirring speech in support of Barry Goldwater's presidential candidacy in 1964, he was persuaded to seek the California governorship, winning two years later and again in 1970. In 1980, as the Republican nominee for president of the United States, he defeated incumbent Jimmy Carter. He was reelected in a landslide in 1984, proclaiming that it was "Morning in America". Reagan left office in 1989.

Overview

After graduating from Eureka College in Illinois, Reagan moved first to Iowa to work as a radio broadcaster. Then, in 1937, to California where he began a career as an actor, first in films and later television.

In 1964 Reagan endorsed the campaign of conservative presidential contender Barry Goldwater. In his speech, "A Time for Choosing", Reagan stressed the need for smaller government. The speech raised 1 million dollars for Goldwater  and is considered the event that launched Reagan's political career. It also marked a shift of the Republican Party from a moderate to a "Western more politically charged ideology." California Republicans were impressed with Reagan's political views and charisma after his "Time for Choosing" speech, and nominated him for Governor of California in 1966. Reagan was elected governor and served two terms.

At the first Conservative Political Action Conference (CPAC) in 1974 Reagan addressed the attendees saying "We Will Be As a Shining City upon a Hill", in reference to John Winthrop's use of the City upon a Hill trope from Matthew 5:14; with the addition of "shining" it became Reagan's trademark expression.

In 1980 Reagan challenged Jimmy Carter for the presidency of the United States. During their only debate, Reagan used the phrase, "There you go again." The line emerged as a single defining phrase of the 1980 presidential election. The phrase has endured in the political lexicon in news headlines, as a way to quickly refer to various presidential candidates' bringing certain issues up repeatedly during debates, or to Reagan himself. The Associated Press wrote in 2008: "Reagan was a master at capturing a debate moment that everyone will remember. His 'there you go again' line defused his opponent's attack." In the general election Reagan won by a landslide.

Reagan was the first American president to address the British Parliament. In a famous address on June 8, 1982, to the British Parliament in the Royal Gallery of the Palace of Westminster, Reagan said, "the forward march of freedom and democracy will leave Marxism–Leninism on the ash-heap of history."

Reagan ran for reelection in 1984. The Democratic nominee was Walter Mondale. Reagan performed poorly in the first debate, but rebounded in the second debate, and confronted questions about his age, quipping, "I will not make age an issue of this campaign. I am not going to exploit, for political purposes, my opponent's youth and inexperience," which generated applause and laughter, even from Mondale himself. Mondale later recalled that

The disintegration of the Space Shuttle Challenger on January 28, 1986, proved a pivotal moment in Reagan's presidency. All seven astronauts aboard were killed. On the night of the disaster, Reagan delivered a speech, written by Peggy Noonan, in which he said:

The speech is ranked as one of the ten best American political speeches of the 20th century.

Reagan believed that Western Democracy offered the best hope to open the Berlin Wall. On June 12, 1987, he gave a speech at the Wall in which he challenged Soviet leader Mikhail Gorbachev to "Tear down this wall!" Reagan's senior staffers objected to the phrase, but Reagan overruled them saying, "I think we'll leave it in." "Tear down this wall!" has been called "The four most famous words of Ronald Reagan's Presidency." Although there is some disagreement over how much influence Reagan's words had on the destruction of the wall, the speech is remembered as an important moment in Cold War history and was listed by Time magazine as one of the ten greatest speeches in history.

Oratorical style

Reagan's effectiveness as a public speaker earned him the moniker, "Great Communicator." Former Reagan speechwriter Ken Khachigian wrote, "What made him the Great Communicator was Ronald Reagan's determination and ability to educate his audience, to bring his ideas to life by using illustrations and word pictures to make his arguments vivid to the mind's eye. In short: he was America's Teacher."

Franklin D. Roosevelt, from whom Reagan often borrowed, ushered in a new age of presidential communication by broadcasting his "fireside chats" on the newly invented radio. Reagan, in his time, put his own stamp on presidential communication by harnessing the power of television broadcasting. He used skills developed during his radio, film and television career, and according to Lou Cannon, Reagan "set the standard in using television to promote his presidency." Khachigian noted three qualities that fostered Reagan's success. He described Reagan's voice as "a fine Merlot being poured gently into a crystal goblet." Reagan, a trained actor, has excellent "camera presence." Khachigan found Reagan's ability to create word pictures critical in communicating with his audience.

Reagan said that it was his "empathy" with the American people that made him an effective communicator and leader. Reagan was able to connect to people through storytelling. While this simple form of communicating led detractors such as Clark Clifford to label Reagan as "an amiable dunce", Michael K. Deaver likened this dismissive attitude to a "secret weapon."

At the end of his political career, Reagan reflected on the moniker "Great Communicator." At his farewell address he said:

Speeches

Rankings
In 2009 a list was compiled by professors at the University of Wisconsin–Madison and Texas A&M University and based on the opinions of "137 leading scholars of American public address." The speeches by Ronald Reagan which made the list are below:

Time magazine listed the Brandenburg Gate Address on its list of "Top 10 Greatest Speeches".

Debates

Behind the scenes

See also

 Ronald Reagan Speaks Out Against Socialized Medicine
 State of the Union address
 United States presidential election debates

Reagan speechwriters
 Tony Blankley
 Aram Bakshian
 Ben T. Elliott
 Jeffrey Hart
 Ken Khachigian
 Peggy Noonan
 Mari Maseng
 John Podhoretz
 Dana Rohrabacher
 David Tell

References

External links

 Presidential Speech Archive – Ronald Reagan, Miller Center, audio and video files
 The Great Communicator, speech archive at the Ronald Reagan Presidential Foundation & Library
 Ronald Reagan's Major Speeches, speech and debate transcripts at the archive of the Ronald Reagan Presidential Library
 Speeches, images of major speeches at the Ronald Reagan Presidential Library
 Ronald Reagan, In His Own Words, National Public Radio
 Campaigns and Elections, content and videos of debates at the Miller Center
 The Reagan Foundation, official YouTube channel
 Reagan Speech Archive, CNN
 Speeches and other Media Uses by Ronald Reagan, by Russell D. Renka
 President Reagan's 83rd Birthday Celebration, C-SPAN video, February 3, 1994

 
Conservatism-related lists
Articles containing video clips
Reagan, Ronald
Reagan